The G Brooklyn-Queens Crosstown Local is an  rapid transit service in the B Division of the New York City Subway. Its route emblem, or "bullet", is colored  since it uses the IND Crosstown Line.

The G operates at all times between Court Square in Long Island City, Queens, and Church Avenue in Kensington, Brooklyn, making local stops along its entire route. The G is the only non-shuttle service in the system that does not run within the borough of Manhattan. Since the 2000s, several improvements have been made to the G, including a route extension in Brooklyn and a full-route audit that identified solutions for issues on the G service.

The G serves two stations in Queens: Court Square and 21st Street, which are both in Long Island City. Prior to 2010, it served all stations on the IND Queens Boulevard Line between Court Square and 71st Avenue in Forest Hills. In 1939 and 1940, the then-designated GG also used the now-demolished IND World's Fair Line to access the 1939 New York World's Fair. The GG, which became the G in 1985, had its southern terminal at Smith–Ninth Streets from 1976 to 2009.

History

Early service 
The original Brooklyn–Queens Crosstown Local service began on August 19, 1933, as a shuttle between Queens Plaza on the IND Queens Boulevard Line and Nassau Avenue. This service was designated GG because the IND used double letters to indicate local service. Starting on April 24, 1937, GG trains were extended to Forest Hills–71st Avenue during rush hours, serving as the Queens Boulevard local while  trains ran express west of 71st Avenue. The entire IND Crosstown Line was completed on July 1, 1937, including the connection to the IND Culver Line (then the South Brooklyn Line) at Bergen Street. GG service ran at all times between Forest Hills–71st Avenue and Church Avenue. Soon after, it was cut back to Smith–Ninth Streets.

From April 30 to November 1, 1939, and from May 11 to October 28, 1940, GG trains were extended via the temporary IND World's Fair Line to World's Fair Station at Horace Harding Boulevard at all times during the 1939-1940 World's Fair. Trains were marked as S Special. The fair closed on October 28, 1940, with the station and line being demolished later that year. As a result, GG service was truncated to Forest Hills–71st Avenue. Additional GG service was provided for the 1964 New York World's Fair, running nonstop between Hoyt–Schermerhorn Streets station and Roosevelt Avenue every 30 minutes between 10 a.m. and 3:30 p.m. It took 23 minutes for trains to travel between the two stations.

On August 19, 1968, service was again extended to Church Avenue during rush hours to allow for the introduction of  express service on the IND Culver Line. Since riders at local stations complained about the loss of direct service to Manhattan, F trains to and from Kings Highway began making local stops. All peak-direction F trains began running local on January 19, 1976. On August 30, 1976, due to budget cuts, remaining F express service north of Church Avenue was eliminated, and GG service was cut back to Smith–Ninth Streets. On January 24, 1977, as part of a series of NYCTA service cuts to save $13 million, many subway lines began running shorter trains again during middays. As part of the change, GG trains began running with four cars between 9:30 a.m. and 1:30 p.m.. Effective May 6, 1985, use of double letters to indicate local service was discontinued, so the GG was relabeled G.

Afterwards, as part of the New York City Transit Authority's proposed service plan to serve the new Archer Avenue Line upper level, the G would have been extended to Jamaica Center during weekends and evenings when N trains terminated at 71st Avenue or 57th Street–Seventh Avenue. During late nights, a G train shuttle would have run between Jamaica Center and Van Wyck Boulevard. On weekdays, the extension would have been served by N trains. This service plan would have allowed E and F trains to remain on the Queens Boulevard mainline toward 179th Street. The final service plan, which took effect on December 11, 1988, had the extension served by E trains, with R trains extended to 179th Street.

As part of the reroute plan, Queens Plaza became the northern terminal for the G train on evenings, weekends and late nights. On April 14, 1991, weekend service was extended from Queens Plaza to 71st Avenue. Weekend G service was cut back to Queens Plaza on July 26, 1992.

Recent changes 

Beginning on March 23, 1997,  G trains started terminating at Court Square on weekends. On August 30, 1997, late night service was permanently cut back from 179th Street to Court Square, with the F running local east of Queens Plaza replacing G service, meaning that the G only ran along the Queens Boulevard Line on weekdays. Evening service between 9 p.m. and 11 p.m. was cut back from Queens Plaza to Court Square. On December 16, 2001, the 63rd Street Connector opened and Court Square became the northern terminal for the G train during weekdays, while G service was extended to Forest Hills–71st Avenue at all other times, which represented the reverse of the previous pattern. Service along the IND Queens Boulevard Line was replaced by the new  train during weekdays. The G was to be truncated to Court Square at all times to make room for the V, but due to rider opposition, it was cut back only on weekdays until 8:30 p.m. Four G trains in each direction ran to or from Church Avenue. The headway for weekday evening service increased from 12 minutes to 15 minutes, while the headway for rush hour, and Saturday morning and afternoon service decreased from 10 minutes to 8 minutes.

On April 27, 2003, Saturday morning and afternoon G service was decreased, with service running every 12 minutes instead of every 8 minutes, and Sunday afternoon service was decreased to run every 12 minutes instead of every 10 minutes. In addition, Saturday morning and afternoon G trains turned out of service at Fourth Avenue instead of Church Avenue.

On July 5, 2009, the G was once again extended south at all times to Church Avenue. This was required for overhaul of the Culver Viaduct, which caused the express tracks at Smith–Ninth Streets and Fourth Avenue/Ninth Street—used to switch G trains between tracks after they terminated at Smith–Ninth Streets—to be temporarily taken out of service. This had several benefits. First, five stations previously served by only the F train had more frequent service. Additionally, riders from northern Brooklyn and Long Island City had a direct route to Kensington. Finally, since the Church Avenue terminal had four tracks to store terminating G trains, as opposed to only one storage track at Smith–9th Streets, this reduced delays on both services because terminating G trains could switch to the storage tracks without having to wait in the station for another train to leave, as had occurred at Smith–Ninth Street. On July 19, 2012, MTA officials made this extension permanent because it provided more direct connections between Kensington and north Brooklyn.
 
Due to the MTA's financial crisis in the late 2000s, as well as continued capacity issues on the IND Queens Boulevard Line, the G was to be cut back from Forest Hills–71st Avenue to Court Square at all times beginning June 27, 2010. However, due to planned track repairs during the times the G normally ran on the Queens Boulevard Line, it ceased running on that line on April 19. In addition, train headways were increased, which inconvenienced about 201,000 weekly commuters since they had to wait longer for G trains.

Flood waters from Hurricane Sandy caused significant damage to the Greenpoint Tubes under the Newtown Creek. Although the G was back in service days after the hurricane, the tube needed permanent repairs. To allow for these repairs, G service ran only between Nassau Avenue and Church Avenue for twelve weekends between July and December 2013. This schedule was also in effect daily between July 25 and September 2, 2014.

Controversies

The G suffers from a wide range of issues that has resulted in complaints by people living along the route. Historically, it has connected only Brooklyn and Queens, resulting in many people thinking of the G as the subway system's "outcast" and the "unwanted drunk uncle everyone has." One reporter wrote of the G, "[Riders] need it because it goes where no other train does, but they hate that they need it." Compounding to the G "outcast" reputation, some of the G stations along the Crosstown Line are in bad shape. Since 2001, however, a series of service cuts and missing connections to other lines has worsened public opinion of the G.

On December 16, 2001, the G northern terminus was cut back from Forest Hills to Court Square during weekdays, and since April 2010, this service pattern has applied at all times. In addition, between 2001 and 2010, weekend service along the G to Forest Hills had been intermittent, with frequent service changes due to "track work". The 2010 route reduction did increase service frequency on the remainder of the route.

63rd Street Connector service reductions
When the connector to the IND 63rd Street Line from the IND Queens Boulevard Line was put into regular passenger service in December 2001, it not only introduced the new V service, but also allowed up to nine additional trains to and from Manhattan on the Queens Boulevard Line during peak hours. However, to make room for the V train on Queens Boulevard, the G had to terminate at Court Square on weekdays. The reroute of the G was part of the original plans of the 63rd Street tunnel and connector, going back to the late 1960s. The service plan was designed to redistribute Queens-bound passenger loads on the crowded IND Queens Boulevard Line, which ran under 53rd Street while in Manhattan. In turn, this plan was intended to bring better service and transfer opportunities, as the V train allowed direct access to 53rd Street and the IND Sixth Avenue Line for Queens Boulevard Local customers. The New York Times prematurely described the service plan as "complex and heavily criticized" because it put more crowding on the E train.

In response to complaints from G riders at public hearings about losing a major transfer point to Manhattan-bound trains at Queens Plaza, the MTA agreed to a number of compromises, including installing a moving sidewalk in the passageway between Court Square and 23rd Street–Ely Avenue (now served by the ) on the Queens Boulevard Line. In addition, a free out-of-system MetroCard transfer to 45th Road–Court House Square on the IRT Flushing Line was created at those two stations. This special transfer was discontinued on June 3, 2011, when an in-system transfer opened at the corner of 23rd Street and 45th Road, which made only the Flushing Line station ADA-accessible. The MTA provided $17 million in funding for making the Crosstown Line accessible as part of the 2015–2019 Capital Program.

The MTA also agreed to extend the G to Forest Hills–71st Avenue during evenings and weekends (when the V was not running), and run more trains on that route. There was a four-hour period where the G, and V, as well as the Queens Boulevard line's express services, the E and the F, were all running at once since the V stopped running at midnight and the G was extended to 71st Avenue at 8:00 p.m. The authority "had spent several hundred thousand dollars on tests, trying to figure out a way to keep the G train running past Court Square and farther into Queens on weekdays, but because of the addition of the V train, which shared space along the Queens Boulevard Line with the trains already there (the E, F and R trains), G trains could not fit during the daytime, when service is heaviest."

However, due to construction on the Queens Boulevard Line, the G train frequently terminated at Court Square even when the published timetable said it ran to 71st Avenue. Some riders were suspicious that the service disruptions were "simply a de facto way to implement the original plan of halving G train service." The original plans called for the G terminate at Court Square at all times; that plan was shelved in 2001 in the face of community opposition, but due to budget cuts, the MTA decided to implement it in 2010. An MTA spokesman said, "It's not personal…. If you want to keep the system up to date, you need to make sure the track and switching are all in good repair."

Community groups such as Save the G! and the Riders Alliance have been frequent activists for improvements of G service. Save the G! regularly lobbied the MTA for more G train service since the original cutbacks when the V was introduced in 2001. They made the restoration of service to the Queens Boulevard Line at all times an issue in the 2002 New York gubernatorial race, but the transit authority said, "Unfortunately, putting the G back to full service is just not an option, given our track capacity—and that's not likely to change."

Changes to train length 

To increase service and reduce waiting time due to the 63rd Street Connector cutbacks, the G would need more trains, but there were not enough cars available in the system. The solution was to reduce the length of trains in order to increase service frequency. Previously, the G line had run 8  car trains or 6  car trains; both were shorter than the typical  length of B Division trains because ridership was deemed too low to justify running full-length G trains in frequent intervals. Under the 2001 plan, trains were shortened from six  cars to four, sticking all the leftover cars together to make the extra trains for the G, and the additional trains needed for V service. Thus, G service now operates  trains, half the length of normal B Division standards. It also operates One Person Train Operation (OPTO) service during late nights and weekends.

This, however, meant that riders would be packed into smaller trains, and led some passengers to miss trains because they were standing at the wrong part of the platform. In the past, there have been signs indicating where the train stops at some stations, in addition to the "4" and "6" markers next to the tracks used by train operators as stop points. Still, the overall lack of visual identifiers of train stop points on the platforms, the differing stop points during different times of day, and the location of staircases, transfer passageways and platform benches have been cited as a cause of passengers missing trains or being bunched into single cars. Beginning in 2013, additional signs were installed along G train platforms. In 2014, several improvements were implemented due to an infusion of extra funding, with G trains to be lengthened in 2019 (see below).

Non-free transfers
Save the G!, the Riders Alliance, and other organizations have also lobbied for the creation of new free out-of-system transfers to nearby stations. The most prominent is between Broadway on the Crosstown Line and either Hewes Street or Lorimer Street on the BMT Jamaica Line, which are both about three blocks away; this transfer has been previously proposed. In 2005, an MTA spokesperson stated, "We have no intention of making that a permanent free transfer." This sentiment was repeated in 2013, with the MTA citing the loss of around $770,000 in revenue if the transfer were to become free.

A second transfer, from Fulton Street to the busy Atlantic Avenue–Barclays Center complex in Downtown Brooklyn, was rejected by the MTA due to the long walking distance between the two stations, as well as the fact that there is a transfer to Manhattan-bound  trains at Hoyt–Schermerhorn Streets.

A temporary transfer between Broadway and Hewes Street or Lorimer Street (along the BMT Jamaica Line) was reinstated in April 2019 due to L train service changes associated with the 14th Street Tunnel shutdown. The transfer was in effect until May 31, 2020. A temporary, MetroCard-only transfer between 21st Street and Hunters Point Avenue (along the IRT Flushing Line) was proposed, but not implemented.

Improvements

2000s improvements
Most stations along the IND Crosstown Line were built with multiple exits to the street. Over the years, many lower-use exits were closed (as they were in other parts of the subway), as the city was concerned that they were a magnet for criminals; this resulted in G trains along the Crosstown Line needing to stop at the locations closest to the exits. However, in July 2005, in response to community pressure, the MTA agreed to re-open an exit to the southwestern corner of South Portland Avenue to the southbound platform of the Fulton Street station. The New York Times described it as a "minor victory" for "a maligned line." Additionally, exits to the intersection of Powers Street, Hope Street, and Union Avenue at Metropolitan Avenue were reopened on February 28, 2019, to address possible capacity constraints due to the L train shutdown. In 2019, the Court Square station received several new stairways to accommodate increased ridership from L train riders during the reconstruction of the BMT Canarsie Line tunnels under the East River, which started in late April 2019.

The G train's southern extension to Church Avenue, implemented in 2009 and confirmed permanently in 2012, was also seen as a service improvement. It reduced the need for riders from Park Slope and Kensington to make multiple train transfers to get to northern Brooklyn and Long Island City.

Review of the G route
In 2013, at the request of State Senators Daniel Squadron and Martin Malave Dilan, the MTA conducted a review of the entire G route. The route had been maligned by riders because of its unreliability, and the review recommended a few service changes for the G. On June 9, 2014, a budget surplus in the MTA allowed these improvements to be implemented. These improvements included an increase in the number of trains per hour, from six to  trains per hour during evening rush hour; uniform stopping locations for trains, whereas previously, trains stopped at different places along the platform at different times of the day; public service announcement systems on platforms along the IND Crosstown Line; relocated benches; and new CCTV systems installed for OPTO. Such improvements eliminated the infamous "G train sprint," wherein riders ran for G trains that stopped at the other end of the platforms.

From 2010 to 2015, ridership on the G has risen 17%, with approximately 150,000 riders per weekday in 2015. It is the route with the fastest growing ridership base in the entire system. These improvements will also have the additional benefit of being able to accommodate the growing ridership base in gentrified neighborhoods along the line, like Park Slope, Carroll Gardens, Bedford–Stuyvesant, Williamsburg, Greenpoint, and Long Island City. This is due in part to the G weekday frequencies having become more dependable as a result of the 2013 review. Even so, the G continued to have long headways during weekends.

L train shutdown
Despite the influx of ridership, train lengths did not change. However, in 2016, it was announced that the G was expected to receive longer trains to accommodate displaced L train riders in 2019, when the 14th Street Tunnel shutdown was supposed to limit direct L train access to Manhattan. As a result, riders in Williamsburg, Greenpoint, and Bushwick would need to use the G to transfer to other subway routes that travel to Manhattan. The delivery of new R179 subway cars to other routes would make it possible for older fleets from these other routes to be passed onto the G. In addition, three extra G trains per hour would run during peak periods, for a total of 11 trains per hour during the shutdown. A full-length G train would run every five to six minutes, more than doubling the route's total capacity. Since the G train's schedule is designed around that of the F train, train frequencies on both routes would have to be modified.

In July 2018, the MTA published a report stating that the G route would have 15 full-length trains per hour between Court Square and Bedford–Nostrand Avenues, or a rate of one train every four minutes. South of Bedford–Nostrand Avenues, the G would have a headway of 12 trains per hour. The terminus for most of the remaining G trips would be Church Avenue, but some trains would continue two additional stops to 18th Avenue, because only a limited number of trains can terminate at Church Avenue without causing disruptions to F service. In addition, closed entrances would be reopened at Metropolitan Avenue, and the Nassau Avenue and Metropolitan Avenue stations' fare control areas would be reconfigured to accommodate increased ridership.

The L train shutdown was curtailed in January 2019. Instead of being a full-time closure, it would only be a partial closure on nights and weekends. However, the station enhancements along the route were still implemented. The following month, the MTA decided that the G would not receive full-length trains, though it would still see an increase in train frequencies during nights and weekends.

Automation
In December 2022, the MTA announced that it would award a $368 million design–build contract to Crosstown Partners, a joint venture between Thales Group and TC Electric LLC, to install communications-based train control (CBTC) along the length of the G route. The contract includes not only the Crosstown Line between Court Square and Bergen Street, but also the Culver Line between Bergen Street and Church Avenue. Upon the completion of the contract, the G would be one of three routes in the system to be entirely equipped with CBTC.

Route

Service pattern
The G uses the following lines with the same service pattern at all times.

Stations
For a more detailed station listing, see the articles on the lines listed above.

In popular culture 
The G train is shown in the TV series Girls, as the show's main character, Hannah, lives in Greenpoint (near a stop along the G) and sometimes uses the route. The G train is also the subject of the song "G Train" by Thirdstory, featuring Pusha T.

Notes

References

External links

 MTA NYC Transit – G Brooklyn-Queens Crosstown Local
 
 
 MTA NYC Transit –  "NYC Transit G LINE REVIEW"
 Main document
 Appendix – service statistics and proposed improvements. Also includes track diagrams, station layouts, and rolling stock.

New York City Subway services